Switch Radio (also known as Switch Radio 107.5) is a British community radio station, broadcasting from the North East Birmingham region, which transmits 24 hours a day on 107.5 FM, local DAB and via Internet radio.

History 
The station began life under its previous name, Vale FM, when it was formed by residents from the Castle Vale estate in north east Birmingham in 1995. Switch Radio launched in April 2010 and still broadcasts from Castle Vale.

Coverage 
The station's FM broadcast serves the Birmingham suburbs of Minworth, Castle Bromwich, Castle Vale, Bromford, Tyburn, Hurst Green, Walmley, Fox Hollies and Wylde Green. It also broadcasts to the Greater Birmingham area through the region's small-scale DAB multiplex. In addition, the station simulcasts on the internet through its own website and via apps like TuneIn.

See also 
 Community radio in the United Kingdom
 List of radio stations in the United Kingdom

References

External links 
 
 

Radio stations in Birmingham, West Midlands
Contemporary hit radio stations in the United Kingdom
Radio stations established in 2010